Athrips helicaula is a moth of the family Gelechiidae. It is found in South Africa, where it has been recorded from the Northern Cape.

The wingspan is about 14 mm. The forewings are white, tinged with brownish and irrorated with blackish except on the costa and veins, which form undefined white streaks. The hindwings are light grey.

References

Endemic moths of South Africa
Moths described in 1912
Athrips
Moths of Africa